Parameters is a quarterly academic journal published by the United States Army War College.

External links 
 
 Full digital archive at U.S. Army War College

Publications established in 1971
United States Army publications
Military journals
Quarterly journals
English-language journals
Academic journals published by universities and colleges of the United States